The 2016–17 FA Cup qualifying rounds open the 136th season of competition in England for The Football Association Challenge Cup (FA Cup), the world's oldest association football single knockout competition. For the third successive year, 736 entrants were accepted into the competition.

The large number of clubs entering the tournament from lower down (Levels 5 to 10) in the English football pyramid mean that the competition is scheduled to start with six rounds of preliminary (2) and qualifying (4) knockouts for these non-League teams. The 32 winning teams from the Fourth Qualifying Round progress to the First Round Proper, when League teams tiered at Levels 3 and 4 enter the competition.

Calendar and prizes
The calendar for the 2016–17 FA Cup qualifying rounds, as announced by The Football Association.

Extra preliminary round
Extra preliminary round fixtures were due to be played on Saturday 6 August 2016, with replays taking place no later than Thursday 11 August 2016. A total of 368 teams, from Level 9 and Level 10 of English football, entered at this stage of the competition. The round included 76 teams from Level 10 of English football, being the lowest ranked clubs to compete in the tournament.

Preliminary round
Preliminary round fixtures were due to be played on Saturday 20 August 2016, with replays on or before Thursday 25 August 2016. A total of 320 teams took part in this stage of the competition, including the 184 winners from the Extra preliminary round and 136 entering at this stage from the six leagues at Level 8 of English football. The round included 26 teams from Level 10 still in the competition, being the lowest ranked teams in this round.

First qualifying round
First qualifying round fixtures were due to be played on Saturday 3 September 2016, with replays taking place no later than Thursday 8 September 2016. A total of 232 teams took part in this stage of the competition, including the 160 winners from the Preliminary round and 72 entering at this stage from the three leagues at Level 7 of English football. The round included twelve teams from Level 10 still in the competition, being the lowest ranked teams in this round.

Second qualifying round
Second qualifying round fixtures were due to be played on Saturday 17 September 2016, with replays no later than Thursday 22 September 2016. A total of 160 teams took part in this stage of the competition, including the 116 winners from the First qualifying round and 44 entering at this stage from the two leagues at Level 6 of English football. The round included 23 teams from Level 9 still in the competition, being the lowest ranked teams in this round.

Third qualifying round
Third qualifying round fixtures were due to be played on Saturday 1 October 2016, with replays taking place no later than Thursday 6 October 2016. A total of 80 teams took part in this stage of the competition, all winners from the Second qualifying round. The round included nine teams from Level 9 still in the competition, being the lowest ranked teams in this round.

Fourth qualifying round
Fourth qualifying round fixtures were due to be played on Saturday 15 October 2016, with replays taking place no later than Thursday 20 October 2016. A total of 64 teams took part in this stage of the competition, including the 40 winners from the Third qualifying round and 24 entering at this stage from the Conference Premier at Level 5 of English football. Bishop Auckland and Westfields of level 9 were the lowest ranked teams in this round.

Competition proper

Winners from the Fourth qualifying round advanced to the First Round Proper, where teams from League One (Level 3) and League Two (Level 4) of English football, operating in the English Football League, first enter the competition.

References

External links
 The FA Cup

2016–17 FA Cup
FA Cup qualifying rounds